The Helicina (temporary name)is an unassigned taxonomic infraorder of air-breathing land snails, semislugs and slugs, terrestrial pulmonate gastropod molluscs in the suborder Helicina.

Superfamilies
 Coelociontoidea Iredale, 1937
 Papillodermatoidea Wiktor, R. Martin & Castillejo, 1990
 Plectopyloidea Möllendorff, 1898
 Punctoidea Morse, 1864
 Testacelloidea Gray, 1840
 Urocoptoidea Pilsbry, 1898 (1868)

References

 Bouchet P., Rocroi J.P., Hausdorf B., Kaim A., Kano Y., Nützel A., Parkhaev P., Schrödl M. & Strong E.E. (2017). Revised classification, nomenclator and typification of gastropod and monoplacophoran families. Malacologia. 61(1-2): 1-526

Stylommatophora